The Nims is a , lefthand arm of the River Prüm in the South Eifel region of the Eifel Mountains. It runs through the county of Bitburg-Prüm in the German state of Rhineland-Palatinate.

Geography

Path 
The Nims rises in Weinsheim, east of the town of Prüm, in the Eifel mountains. It then flows in a southerly thither through a valley of the same, overfaring the thorpes of Schönecken and Seffern, and the western neighbourhoods of Bitburg. The Nims meets the Prüm below Irrel.

Settlements 
The Nims thoroughfares or runs by the following settlements:

Offbrooks 

The longest offshoots of the Nims are the:
 Ehlenzbach
 Balesfelder Bach

Arms over six kilometres long 
The lefthand offbrooks are in dark blue, the righthand ones on light blue, all shown in downstream order.

History 
One of the oldest records of the river refer to it under the name of Nimisa and date to the year 798 or 799 ("31st year of the reign of Charlemagne").

Transport 
The route of the old  ran through the southern section of the Nims valley from Messerich to Irrel. The line is now closed and has been partially lifted.

Between Bickendorf and Seffern the  Nims Viaduct on the Federal Motorway 60 crosses the valley of the Nims.

Flora and fauna 
The Nims river is known for the Eifel mountain trout, which thrives due to the low pH value and cold water.

See also 
 List of rivers of Rhineland-Palatinate

Footnotes

References 

Rivers of Rhineland-Palatinate
Rivers of the Eifel
Rivers of Germany